Marcin Niewalda (born 1969 in Kraków), genealogist, musician, photographer, member of Art-Club of Wieliczka, editor-in-chief of Dynamic Armorial of Polish Families.

Notes

1969 births
Living people
Photographers from Kraków